Abdulrahim Anbar Jumaa (born 23 May 1979) is an Emirati footballer who played as a midfielder.

Jumaa has frequently captained the United Arab Emirates national football team and led the team to their first trophy, the 2007 Gulf Cup held in Abu Dhabi. He has made 27 appearances in qualifying matches for various FIFA World Cups, adding to a total of 116 caps, one of the highest among UAE internationals.

See also
 List of men's footballers with 100 or more international caps

References

External links
 
 
 

1979 births
Living people
Emirati footballers
United Arab Emirates international footballers
Al Wahda FC players
Al Jazira Club players
Al Dhafra FC players
FIFA Century Club
UAE Pro League players
Footballers at the 1998 Asian Games
Footballers at the 2002 Asian Games
Association football midfielders
Asian Games competitors for the United Arab Emirates
2007 AFC Asian Cup players